Xylopia richardii is a species of plant in the Annonaceae family. It is found in Mauritius and Réunion. It is threatened by habitat loss.

References

Xylopia
Taxonomy articles created by Polbot
Taxa named by Henri Ernest Baillon